Billie Sørum (née Skjerpen; born 13 August 1948 in Sandvika) is a former Norwegian curler.

At the international level, she is a  silver (1991) and bronze (1992) medallist.

At the national level, she is a three-time Norwegian women's champion curler (1986, 1987, 1988).

Teams

References

External links
 

Living people
1948 births
Sportspeople from Bærum
Norwegian female curlers
Norwegian curling champions